Parastenopa limata is a species of fruit fly in the family Tephritidae.

References

Trypetinae
Articles created by Qbugbot
Insects described in 1899